Sülüklü can refer to:

 Sülüklü, Mecitözü
 Sülüklü, Narman